Ministry of the Ecological Transition may refer to:

 Ministry of the Ecological Transition (France)
 Ministry of the Ecological Transition (Italy)
 Ministry for the Ecological Transition and the Demographic Challenge (Spain)

Climate change ministries